Clinton Randolph Wyckoff (September 4, 1874 – August 16, 1947) was an American college football player, and the first consensus All-American not from Yale, Harvard, Princeton or Penn. He was elected to the College Football Hall of Fame in 1970. 

Wyckoff was born in Elmira, New York and attended Elmira Free Academy. He then attended Cornell University, just to Elmira's north, where he was graduated in 1896. At Cornell he was captain of the football team immediately succeeding the Pop Warner. He was also a member of the Kappa Alpha Society at Cornell. 

Wyckoff later went on to work for Atlas Steel Company.

References

External links
 
 

1874 births
1947 deaths
19th-century players of American football
American football quarterbacks
Cornell Big Red football players
All-American college football players
College Football Hall of Fame inductees
Sportspeople from Elmira, New York
Players of American football from New York (state)